Grand Café may refer to many coffees and restaurants in particularly :

 , one of the restaurants of the Grand Hotel in Oslo, Norway
 Grand Café, Moulins in Moulins, in the French department of Allier
 Grand Cafe Orient, in the House of Black Madonna,  the "Old Town" area of Prague, Czech Republic

See also
 Gran Café de París in Sevilla, Spain
 Salon Indien du Grand Café, in the former basement of the Grand Café, Paris